Linton Township is one of the twenty-two townships of Coshocton County, Ohio, United States. The 2010 census reported 646 people living in the township, 489 of whom were in the unincorporated portions.

Geography
Located in the southeastern corner of the county, it borders the following townships:
Oxford Township - northeast
Wheeling Township, Guernsey County - east
Knox Township, Guernsey County - southeast
Monroe Township, Muskingum County - south
Adams Township, Muskingum County - southwest corner
Franklin Township - west
Lafayette Township - northwest

The village of Plainfield is located in northeastern Linton Township. Linton Township contains the unincorporated community of Bacon.

Name and history
Linton Township was organized in 1812.

It is the only Linton Township statewide.

Government
The township is governed by a three-member board of trustees, who are elected in November of odd-numbered years to a four-year term beginning on the following January 1. Two are elected in the year after the presidential election and one is elected in the year before it. There is also an elected township fiscal officer, who serves a four-year term beginning on April 1 of the year after the election, which is held in November of the year before the presidential election. Vacancies in the fiscal officership or on the board of trustees are filled by the remaining trustees.

References

External links
County website

Townships in Coshocton County, Ohio
Townships in Ohio